Sir Peter Jeffrey Simpson    is an English anaesthesiologist who was the President of the Royal College of Anaesthetists from 2003 to 2006. He was knighted in June 2006 for his services to the National Health Service.

References

British anaesthetists
Fellows of the Royal College of Anaesthetists
Knights Bachelor
Living people
Presidents of the Royal College of Anaesthetists
Year of birth missing (living people)